Boatlaname is a village in Kweneng District of Botswana. The population of Boatlaname was 770 in 2001 census.

References

Kweneng District
Villages in Botswana